Gare de Saint-Lô is a railway station serving the town Saint-Lô, Manche department, Normandy, northwestern France.

It is situated on the Lison–Lamballe railway. On the Railplanner app (EUrail) the station is listed as St-Lô (France).

World War II bombardment

During the Normandy Campaign, Allied bombing in the Battle of Saint-Lô focused on the railroad station for its strategic importance.

Services

The station is served by local trains between Caen and Granville.

References

External links
 

Railway stations in Manche
Railway stations in France opened in 1860